Magnolia West High School (MWHS) is one of two public high schools in the Magnolia Independent School District in Magnolia, Texas, United States.

Description
Located in Magnolia, Texas, an exurb of Houston, the school opened in August 2006 in order to relieve crowding at Magnolia High School. MWHS served grades 9 and 10 in the 2007–2008 school year and grades 9 through 12 in the 2009–2010 school year.

Demographics
In the 2018–2019 school year, there were 2,041 students enrolled at Magnolia West High School. The ethnic distribution of students was as follows:
 2.1% African American
 0.6% Asian
 34.3% Hispanic
 0.8% American Indian
 0.1% Pacific Islander
 60.8% White
 1.4% Two or More Races

47.3% of students were eligible for free or reduced-price lunch.

Academics
For each school year, the Texas Education Agency rates school performance using an A–F grading system based on statistical data. For 2018–2019, the school received a score of 86 out of 100, resulting in a B grade. The school received a score of 83 the previous year.

Athletics
MWHS offers a number of athletic programs, including football, basketball soccer, baseball, volleyball, softball, track and field, cross country, swim, tennis, athletic training, cheerleading, dance, and golf. They also have a marching band. The school teams are known as the Mustangs and the school colors are maroon and gold.

Clubs and activities
Magnolia West High School's clubs include Academic Decathlon, anime club, creative writing club, debate, DECA, DIY Club, FCCLA, Fellowship of Christian Athletes, Future Farmers of America, French club, Interact club, game club, and ping pong club.

Notable alumni
Trevor Stephan, baseball player

References

External links
Magnolia Independent School District

High schools in Montgomery County, Texas
Public high schools in Texas